Feyyaz Duman (born 15 June 1982) is a Turkish actor of Kurdish descent. Duman was born in 1982 in Mardin. He is a graduate of Istanbul Technical University State Conservatory with a degree in folk dance studies. He then moved to New York to take acting lessons and returned to Turkey after 5 years. With his role in the movie Annemin Şarkısı, he won the Best Actor award at the 51st International Golden Orange Film Festival. He made his television debut in 2016 with a recurring role in İçerde. His breakthrough came with his portrayal of the character Arif in Fox drama series Kadın.

Filmography

Television

Film

Awards 
 Sarajevo Film Festival - Best Actor (2014)
 51st Golden Orange Film Festival - Best Actor (2014)
 Duhok International Film Festival - Best Actor (2015)

References

External links 
 
 

1982 births
Living people
Turkish people of Kurdish descent
Turkish male film actors
Turkish male television actors
Best Actor Golden Orange Award winners
People from Mardin